Volume One, Volume 1, Volume I or Vol. 1 may refer to:

Albums
Volume One (The West Coast Pop Art Experimental Band album), 1966
Volume One (Sleep album)
Volume One (Fluff album)
Volume One (She & Him album), 2008
Volume One (Two Steps from Hell album), 2006
The Honeydrippers: Volume One, 1984
Vol. I (Dead Combo album)
Vol. 1 (Birds of Maya album), 2008
Vol. 1 (EP), by Breed 77
Vol. 1 (Hurt album), 2006
Vol. 1 (Nekropolis album), 2003
Vol. 1 (The Tempers album), 2010
Vol. 1 (We Are The Becoming album),  2008
Vol. 1 (BROS_album), 2016
Vol. 1 (Goatsnake album), 1999
Volume 1 (Reagan Youth album)
Volume 1 (CKY album)
Volume I (Queensberry album), 2008
Volume 1 (Fabrizio De André album), 1967
Volume 1 (Billy Bragg album), 2006
Volume 1 (The Besnard Lakes album), 2003
Volume 1 (BNQT album), 2017
Volume 1 (Future Boy album)
Volume 1, a video album by Mushroomhead
Volume One, the remastered version of The Soft Machine by Soft Machine
 Club Classics Vol. One, by Soul II Soul
Good Apollo, I'm Burning Star IV, Volume One: From Fear Through the Eyes of Madness, by Coheed and Cambria
Traveling Wilburys Vol. 1, 1988
Volume 1, 2014 box set from The Bats
Volume I, a 2015 EP by September Mourning

Books
Volume One, the first volume of Volume

Television
Volume One (TV series), aired in 1949

See also
Volume Zero (disambiguation)
Volume Two (disambiguation)
Volume Three (disambiguation)
Volume Four (disambiguation)
Volume Five (disambiguation)
Volume Six (disambiguation)
Volume Seven (disambiguation)
Volume Eight (disambiguation)
Volume Nine (disambiguation)
Volume Ten (disambiguation)